

Offseason 
 October 3, 1955: Peanuts Lowrey was released by the Phillies.
 November 7, 1955: Wally Westlake was signed as a free agent by the Phillies.
 December 9, 1955: Frank Baumholtz was purchased by the Phillies from the Chicago Cubs.

Regular season

Season standings

Record vs. opponents

Notable transactions 
 May 14, 1956: Bobby Morgan was traded by the Phillies to the St. Louis Cardinals for Solly Hemus.
 May 18, 1956: Wally Westlake was released by the Phillies.
 June 29, 1956: Art Mahaffey was signed as an amateur free agent by the Phillies.
 July 19, 1956: Bob Lipski was signed as an amateur free agent by the Phillies.

Game log

|- style="background:#bfb"
| 1 || April 17 || @ Dodgers || 8–6 || Robin Roberts (1–0) || Don Newcombe (0–1) || None || 24,236 || 1–0
|- style="background:#fbb"
| 2 || April 19 || @ Dodgers || 4–5 (10) || Clem Labine (1–0) || Murry Dickson (0–1) || None || 12,214 || 1–1
|- style="background:#bfb"
| 3 || April 20 || Giants || 2–1 (10) || Jack Meyer (1–0) || Hoyt Wilhelm (0–1) || None || 25,194 || 2–1
|- style="background:#bfb"
| 4 || April 22 (1) || Giants || 3–1 || Robin Roberts (2–0) || Johnny Antonelli (1–1) || None || see 2nd game || 3–1
|- style="background:#fbb"
| 5 || April 22 (2) || Giants || 7–9 || Rubén Gómez (1–0) || Curt Simmons (0–1) || Marv Grissom (1) || 24,771 || 3–2
|- style="background:#fbb"
| 6 || April 23 || Dodgers || 1–6 || Don Drysdale (1–0) || Murry Dickson (0–2) || None || 12,690 || 3–3
|- style="background:#bbb"
| – || April 24 || Dodgers || colspan=6 | Postponed (cold); Makeup: July 8 as a traditional double-header
|- style="background:#fbb"
| 7 || April 25 || Pirates || 5–6 || Vern Law (1–2) || Jim Owens (0–1) || Nellie King (1) || 5,347 || 3–4
|- style="background:#fbb"
| 8 || April 27 || @ Giants || 3–5 || Al Worthington (1–1) || Herm Wehmeier (0–1) || None || 6,465 || 3–5
|- style="background:#bfb"
| 9 || April 28 || @ Giants || 6–2 || Robin Roberts (3–0) || Johnny Antonelli (1–2) || None || 8,297 || 4–5
|- style="background:#bfb"
| 10 || April 29 (1) || @ Giants || 5–4 (10) || Jack Meyer (2–0) || Hoyt Wilhelm (0–2) || None || see 2nd game || 5–5
|- style="background:#fbb"
| 11 || April 29 (2) || @ Giants || 1–8 || Ramón Monzant (1–0) || Curt Simmons (0–2) || None || 18,689 || 5–6
|-

|- style="background:#fbb"
| 12 || May 1 || @ Braves || 4–6 || Dave Jolly (1–0) || Murry Dickson (0–3) || None || 13,950 || 5–7
|- style="background:#fbb"
| 13 || May 4 || @ Cubs || 1–2 || Bob Rush (1–1) || Robin Roberts (3–1) || None || 2,647 || 5–8
|- style="background:#bbb"
| – || May 5 || @ Cubs || colspan=6 | Postponed (rain); Makeup: July 18 as a traditional double-header
|- style="background:#fbb"
| 14 || May 6 (1) || @ Redlegs || 2–10 || Brooks Lawrence (3–0) || Jim Owens (0–2) || None || see 2nd game || 5–9
|- style="background:#fbb"
| 15 || May 6 (2) || @ Redlegs || 9–11 || Hersh Freeman (2–0) || Saul Rogovin (0–1) || None || 23,639 || 5–10
|- style="background:#fbb"
| 16 || May 8 || @ Cardinals || 1–9 || Willard Schmidt (2–0) || Robin Roberts (3–2) || Larry Jackson (1) || 7,379 || 5–11
|- style="background:#fbb"
| 17 || May 9 || @ Cardinals || 0–3 || Tom Poholsky (3–0) || Herm Wehmeier (0–2) || None || 8,704 || 5–12
|- style="background:#fbb"
| 18 || May 11 || @ Pirates || 5–6 || Luis Arroyo (1–0) || Jack Meyer (2–1) || None || 17,605 || 5–13
|- style="background:#fbb"
| 19 || May 12 || @ Pirates || 5–6 || Bob Friend (4–2) || Robin Roberts (3–3) || Nellie King (2) || 20,115 || 5–14
|- style="background:#fbb"
| 20 || May 13 (1) || @ Pirates || 9–11 || Roy Face (2–0) || Jack Meyer (2–2) || Vern Law (2) || see 2nd game || 5–15
|- style="background:#bfb"
| 21 || May 13 (2) || @ Pirates || 7–2 || Saul Rogovin (1–1) || Dick Hall (0–4) || Robin Roberts (1) || 20,435 || 6–15
|- style="background:#bfb"
| 22 || May 15 || Braves || 3–1 || Stu Miller (1–1) || Lew Burdette (1–2) || None || 13,141 || 7–15
|- style="background:#bfb"
| 23 || May 16 || Braves || 2–1 || Robin Roberts (4–3) || Bob Buhl (2–2) || None || 11,510 || 8–15
|- style="background:#fbb"
| 24 || May 17 || Cardinals || 4–5 || Ellis Kinder (1–0) || Harvey Haddix (1–1) || Jackie Collum (2) || 8,249 || 8–16
|- style="background:#bfb"
| 25 || May 18 || Cardinals || 4–2 || Curt Simmons (1–2) || Willard Schmidt (2–1) || None || 16,026 || 9–16
|- style="background:#fbb"
| 26 || May 19 || Cardinals || 5–11 || Lindy McDaniel (3–0) || Saul Rogovin (1–2) || None || 7,605 || 9–17
|- style="background:#fbb"
| 27 || May 20 (1) || Redlegs || 1–5 || Art Fowler (3–4) || Robin Roberts (4–4) || None || see 2nd game || 9–18
|- style="background:#bfb"
| 28 || May 20 (2) || Redlegs || 6–4 || Bob Miller (1–0) || Paul LaPalme (1–1) || Harvey Haddix (1) || 21,677 || 10–18
|- style="background:#bbb"
| – || May 22 || Cubs || colspan=6 | Postponed (rain); Makeup: June 15 as a traditional double-header
|- style="background:#fbb"
| 29 || May 23 || Cubs || 4–5 || Vito Valentinetti (1–1) || Harvey Haddix (1–2) || None || 5,795 || 10–19
|- style="background:#bfb"
| 30 || May 24 || Dodgers || 6–4 || Robin Roberts (5–4) || Don Drysdale (1–2) || None || 16,432 || 11–19
|- style="background:#fbb"
| 31 || May 25 || Pirates || 5–8 || Nellie King (3–1) || Curt Simmons (1–3) || Red Munger (1) || 10,407 || 11–20
|- style="background:#fbb"
| 32 || May 26 || Pirates || 2–6 || Vern Law (2–3) || Stu Miller (1–2) || None || 4,614 || 11–21
|- style="background:#bbb"
| – || May 27 (1) || Pirates || colspan=6 | Postponed (rain); Makeup: August 14 as a traditional double-header
|- style="background:#bbb"
| – || May 27 (2) || Pirates || colspan=6 | Postponed (rain); Makeup: August 16
|- style="background:#bfb"
| 33 || May 28 || Giants || 5–2 || Harvey Haddix (2–2) || Al Worthington (1–5) || Robin Roberts (2) || 10,430 || 12–21
|- style="background:#fbb"
| 34 || May 30 (1) || Dodgers || 5–6 || Ed Roebuck (1–1) || Robin Roberts (5–5) || Clem Labine (4) || see 2nd game || 12–22
|- style="background:#bfb"
| 35 || May 30 (2) || Dodgers || 12–3 || Saul Rogovin (2–2) || Don Drysdale (1–3) || None || 35,942 || 13–22
|-

|- style="background:#bfb"
| 36 || June 1 || @ Cardinals || 5–2 || Curt Simmons (2–3) || Tom Poholsky (3–3) || Bob Miller (1) || 8,868 || 14–22
|- style="background:#bfb"
| 37 || June 2 || @ Cardinals || 6–4 || Stu Miller (2–2) || Herm Wehmeier (1–5) || Bob Miller (2) || 7,806 || 15–22
|- style="background:#fbb"
| 38 || June 3 (1) || @ Cardinals || 1–2 || Murry Dickson (3–4) || Robin Roberts (5–6) || None || see 2nd game || 15–23
|- style="background:#bfb"
| 39 || June 3 (2) || @ Cardinals || 9–3 || Harvey Haddix (3–2) || Lindy McDaniel (4–1) || None || 18,367 || 16–23
|- style="background:#fbb"
| 40 || June 4 || @ Redlegs || 2–8 || Art Fowler (4–6) || Saul Rogovin (2–3) || None || 6,883 || 16–24
|- style="background:#fbb"
| 41 || June 5 || @ Redlegs || 4–9 || Joe Nuxhall (2–5) || Curt Simmons (2–4) || None || 9,639 || 16–25
|- style="background:#fbb"
| 42 || June 6 || @ Redlegs || 3–7 || Brooks Lawrence (7–0) || Stu Miller (2–3) || Hersh Freeman (4) || 8,896 || 16–26
|- style="background:#fbb"
| 43 || June 7 || @ Redlegs || 5–8 || Joe Nuxhall (3–5) || Bob Miller (1–1) || Hersh Freeman (5) || 4,657 || 16–27
|- style="background:#fbb"
| 44 || June 8 || @ Cubs || 4–5 || Vito Valentinetti (2–1) || Robin Roberts (5–7) || None || 5,065 || 16–28
|- style="background:#bfb"
| 45 || June 9 || @ Cubs || 6–4 || Saul Rogovin (3–3) || Russ Meyer (1–4) || Bob Miller (3) || 11,910 || 17–28
|- style="background:#fbb"
| 46 || June 10 (1) || @ Cubs || 1–2 (11) || Vito Valentinetti (3–1) || Curt Simmons (2–5) || None || see 2nd game || 17–29
|- style="background:#fbb"
| 47 || June 10 (2) || @ Cubs || 2–5 || Sam Jones (3–4) || Jim Owens (0–3) || Turk Lown (3) || 21,989 || 17–30
|- style="background:#bfb"
| 48 || June 11 || @ Braves || 6–2 || Stu Miller (3–3) || Gene Conley (1–3) || None || 19,488 || 18–30
|- style="background:#bfb"
| 49 || June 12 || @ Braves || 5–2 || Harvey Haddix (4–2) || Bob Buhl (5–3) || None || 27,483 || 19–30
|- style="background:#fbb"
| 50 || June 13 || @ Braves || 6–8 || Ray Crone (5–3) || Robin Roberts (5–8) || Gene Conley (1) || 22,051 || 19–31
|- style="background:#bfb"
| 51 || June 15 (1) || Cubs || 6–5 (10) || Jack Meyer (3–2) || Turk Lown (1–3) || None || see 2nd game || 20–31
|- style="background:#fbb"
| 52 || June 15 (2) || Cubs || 5–8 || Vito Valentinetti (4–1) || Bob Miller (1–2) || Jim Davis (1) || 18,272 || 20–32
|- style="background:#bbb"
| – || June 16 || Cubs || colspan=6 | Postponed (rain, wet grounds); Makeup: July 30 as a traditional double-header
|- style="background:#bfb"
| 53 || June 17 (1) || Cubs || 7–1 || Robin Roberts (6–8) || Warren Hacker (1–6) || None || see 2nd game || 21–32
|- style="background:#fbb"
| 54 || June 17 (2) || Cubs || 4–7 || Sam Jones (4–4) || Jim Owens (0–4) || None || 11,424 || 21–33
|- style="background:#fbb"
| 55 || June 18 || Redlegs || 4–7 (10) || Brooks Lawrence (8–0) || Harvey Haddix (4–3) || None || 10,820 || 21–34
|- style="background:#bfb"
| 56 || June 19 || Redlegs || 4–2 || Jack Meyer (4–2) || Johnny Klippstein (6–4) || None || 13,549 || 22–34
|- style="background:#bfb"
| 57 || June 20 || Redlegs || 3–2 || Curt Simmons (3–5) || Art Fowler (4–7) || None || 12,272 || 23–34
|- style="background:#bfb"
| 58 || June 22 || Cardinals || 2–1 || Robin Roberts (7–8) || Tom Poholsky (4–5) || None || 20,258 || 24–34
|- style="background:#bfb"
| 59 || June 23 || Cardinals || 8–3 || Harvey Haddix (5–3) || Don Liddle (1–3) || None || 6,307 || 25–34
|- style="background:#fbb"
| 60 || June 24 (1) || Cardinals || 4–8 || Herm Wehmeier (3–6) || Curt Simmons (3–6) || None || see 2nd game || 25–35
|- style="background:#bfb"
| 61 || June 24 (2) || Cardinals || 3–2 || Jack Meyer (5–2) || Willard Schmidt (4–4) || None || 19,246 || 26–35
|- style="background:#fbb"
| 62 || June 25 || Braves || 5–8 || Bob Buhl (8–3) || Stu Miller (3–4) || Warren Spahn (1) || 14,467 || 26–36
|- style="background:#bfb"
| 63 || June 26 || Braves || 4–2 || Robin Roberts (8–8) || Ray Crone (7–4) || None || 23,975 || 27–36
|- style="background:#bfb"
| 64 || June 27 || Braves || 4–3 (11) || Ron Negray (1–0) || Ernie Johnson (1–2) || None || 15,521 || 28–36
|- style="background:#fbb"
| 65 || June 29 || @ Dodgers || 5–6 || Clem Labine (7–2) || Jack Meyer (5–3) || None || 12,229 || 28–37
|- style="background:#fbb"
| 66 || June 30 || @ Dodgers || 7–10 || Carl Erskine (5–6) || Robin Roberts (8–9) || Clem Labine (10) || 8,525 || 28–38
|-

|- style="background:#bfb"
| 67 || July 1 (1) || @ Dodgers || 7–4 || Stu Miller (4–4) || Clem Labine (7–3) || Jack Meyer (1) || see 2nd game || 29–38
|- style="background:#fbb"
| 68 || July 1 (2) || @ Dodgers || 1–4 || Roger Craig (8–2) || Saul Rogovin (3–4) || None || 18,299 || 29–39
|- style="background:#fbb"
| 69 || July 3 || @ Pirates || 5–6 || Johnny O'Brien (1–0) || Jack Meyer (5–4) || None || 5,804 || 29–40
|- style="background:#bfb"
| 70 || July 4 (1) || @ Pirates || 4–2 || Harvey Haddix (6–3) || Ron Kline (6–9) || None || see 2nd game || 30–40
|- style="background:#fbb"
| 71 || July 4 (2) || @ Pirates || 4–8 || Roy Face (6–4) || Stu Miller (4–5) || None || 16,076 || 30–41
|- style="background:#fbb"
| 72 || July 6 || Dodgers || 1–2 || Carl Erskine (6–6) || Robin Roberts (8–10) || None || 19,372 || 30–42
|- style="background:#bfb"
| 73 || July 7 || Dodgers || 6–3 || Saul Rogovin (4–4) || Roger Craig (8–3) || Bob Miller (4) || 26,575 || 31–42
|- style="background:#fbb"
| 74 || July 8 (1) || Dodgers || 2–9 || Don Newcombe (11–5) || Stu Miller (4–6) || None || see 2nd game || 31–43
|- style="background:#bfb"
| 75 || July 8 (2) || Dodgers || 3–2 || Jack Meyer (6–4) || Sal Maglie (2–2) || None || 26,417 || 32–43
|- style="background:#bbcaff;"
| – || July 10 ||colspan="7" |1956 Major League Baseball All-Star Game at Griffith Stadium in Washington
|- style="background:#bfb"
| 76 || July 12 || @ Redlegs || 7–4 || Harvey Haddix (7–3) || Art Fowler (5–9) || Ron Negray (1) || 12,331 || 33–43
|- style="background:#bfb"
| 77 || July 13 || @ Redlegs || 6–4 || Curt Simmons (4–6) || Tom Acker (1–1) || None || 16,205 || 34–43
|- style="background:#bfb"
| 78 || July 14 || @ Redlegs || 2–0 || Robin Roberts (9–10) || Johnny Klippstein (7–5) || None || 9,702 || 35–43
|- style="background:#fbb"
| 79 || July 15 (1) || @ Cardinals || 1–9 || Murry Dickson (7–7) || Stu Miller (4–7) || Larry Jackson (3) || see 2nd game || 35–44
|- style="background:#bfb"
| 80 || July 15 (2) || @ Cardinals || 7–5 || Saul Rogovin (5–4) || Lindy McDaniel (4–3) || Ron Negray (2) || 17,577 || 36–44
|- style="background:#bfb"
| 81 || July 16 || @ Cardinals || 2–0 || Harvey Haddix (8–3) || Willard Schmidt (4–5) || None || 9,462 || 37–44
|- style="background:#fbb"
| 82 || July 17 || @ Cubs || 2–3 (16) || Turk Lown (5–3) || Jack Meyer (6–5) || None || 4,192 || 37–45
|- style="background:#bfb"
| 83 || July 18 (1) || @ Cubs || 6–4 || Robin Roberts (10–10) || Jim Brosnan (2–4) || None || see 2nd game || 38–45
|- style="background:#bfb"
| 84 || July 18 (2) || @ Cubs || 6–1 || Curt Simmons (5–6) || Jim Davis (3–4) || None || 14,331 || 39–45
|- style="background:#fbb"
| 85 || July 19 || @ Cubs || 3–4 (10) || Turk Lown (6–3) || Bob Miller (1–3) || None || 4,348 || 39–46
|- style="background:#fbb"
| 86 || July 20 || @ Braves || 0–10 || Bob Buhl (12–4) || Stu Miller (4–8) || None || 28,134 || 39–47
|- style="background:#bfb"
| 87 || July 21 || @ Braves || 8–5 (15) || Stu Miller (5–8) || Lou Sleater (1–2) || Jack Meyer (2) || 34,764 || 40–47
|- style="background:#fbb"
| 88 || July 22 (1) || @ Braves || 7–8 || Ray Crone (9–5) || Robin Roberts (10–11) || Dave Jolly (6) || see 2nd game || 40–48
|- style="background:#fbb"
| 89 || July 22 (2) || @ Braves || 5–16 || Lew Burdette (12–4) || Ron Negray (1–1) || Taylor Phillips (1) || 39,679 || 40–49
|- style="background:#bfb"
| 90 || July 24 || Cardinals || 7–3 || Curt Simmons (6–6) || Vinegar Bend Mizell (9–8) || None || 16,775 || 41–49
|- style="background:#fbb"
| 91 || July 25 || Cardinals || 7–8 (10) || Larry Jackson (1–0) || Ron Negray (1–2) || None || 17,024 || 41–50
|- style="background:#fbb"
| 92 || July 26 || Cardinals || 9–14 || Herm Wehmeier (5–8) || Bob Miller (1–4) || Jackie Collum (4) || 15,078 || 41–51
|- style="background:#bfb"
| 93 || July 27 || Braves || 5–2 || Saul Rogovin (6–4) || Lew Burdette (12–5) || None || 20,103 || 42–51
|- style="background:#bbb"
| – || July 28 || Braves || colspan=6 | Postponed (rain); Makeup: September 13 as a traditional double-header
|- style="background:#bfb"
| 94 || July 29 || Braves || 5–2 || Curt Simmons (7–6) || Warren Spahn (10–8) || None || 16,972 || 43–51
|- style="background:#bfb"
| 95 || July 30 (1) || Cubs || 5–4 || Robin Roberts (11–11) || Vito Valentinetti (5–2) || None || see 2nd game || 44–51
|- style="background:#bfb"
| 96 || July 30 (2) || Cubs || 4–2 || Harvey Haddix (9–3) || Warren Hacker (2–9) || None || 20,536 || 45–51
|- style="background:#fbb"
| 97 || July 31 || Cubs || 4–9 || Sam Jones (5–10) || Stu Miller (5–9) || Turk Lown (9) || 13,788 || 45–52
|-

|- style="background:#bfb"
| 98 || August 1 || Cubs || 10–8 || Robin Roberts (12–11) || Vito Valentinetti (5–3) || None || 7,520 || 46–52
|- style="background:#bfb"
| 99 || August 3 || Redlegs || 6–3 || Curt Simmons (8–6) || Brooks Lawrence (15–3) || None || 28,607 || 47–52
|- style="background:#bfb"
| 100 || August 4 || Redlegs || 10–6 || Robin Roberts (13–11) || Hersh Freeman (9–4) || None || 11,321 || 48–52
|- style="background:#bbb"
| – || August 5 (1) || Redlegs || colspan=6 | Postponed (rain); Makeup: September 18 as a traditional double-header
|- style="background:#bbb"
| – || August 5 (2) || Redlegs || colspan=6 | Postponed (rain); Makeup: September 19 as a traditional double-header
|- style="background:#bbb"
| – || August 6 || @ Giants || colspan=6 | Postponed (rain); Makeup: August 7 as a traditional double-header
|- style="background:#bfb"
| 101 || August 7 (1) || @ Giants || 4–3 || Harvey Haddix (10–3) || Hoyt Wilhelm (2–7) || Bob Miller (5) || see 2nd game || 49–52
|- style="background:#bfb"
| 102 || August 7 (1) || @ Giants || 3–1 || Curt Simmons (9–6) || Johnny Antonelli (9–12) || None || 7,648 || 50–52
|- style="background:#bfb"
| 103 || August 8 || @ Giants || 8–3 || Robin Roberts (14–11) || Jim Hearn (4–11) || None || 3,485 || 51–52
|- style="background:#fbb"
| 104 || August 9 || @ Giants || 2–5 || Joe Margoneri (4–2) || Saul Rogovin (6–5) || Marv Grissom (6) || 2,552 || 51–53
|- style="background:#bfb"
| 105 || August 10 || @ Dodgers || 3–2 || Jack Meyer (7–5) || Sal Maglie (5–4) || Harvey Haddix (2) || 16,025 || 52–53
|- style="background:#fbb"
| 106 || August 11 || @ Dodgers || 2–5 || Don Newcombe (18–5) || Bob Miller (1–5) || None || 12,652 || 52–54
|- style="background:#fbb"
| 107 || August 12 || @ Dodgers || 3–7 || Roger Craig (11–7) || Robin Roberts (14–12) || Clem Labine (14) || 17,076 || 52–55
|- style="background:#bfb"
| 108 || August 14 (1) || Pirates || 3–0 || Harvey Haddix (11–3) || Bob Friend (13–12) || None || see 2nd game || 53–55
|- style="background:#bfb"
| 109 || August 14 (2) || Pirates || 11–2 || Curt Simmons (10–6) || Red Munger (3–3) || None || 32,873 || 54–55
|- style="background:#fbb"
| 110 || August 15 || Pirates || 1–5 || Ron Kline (10–13) || Jack Meyer (7–6) || None || 12,337 || 54–56
|- style="background:#fbb"
| 111 || August 16 || Pirates || 1–4 || Vern Law (6–13) || Robin Roberts (14–13) || None || 7,070 || 54–57
|- style="background:#bfb"
| 112 || August 17 || Dodgers || 3–2 || Ron Negray (2–2) || Roger Craig (11–8) || None || 25,005 || 55–57
|- style="background:#fbb"
| 113 || August 18 || Dodgers || 2–9 || Sal Maglie (6–4) || Harvey Haddix (11–4) || None || 30,168 || 55–58
|- style="background:#fbb"
| 114 || August 19 || Dodgers || 2–3 || Don Newcombe (19–6) || Curt Simmons (10–7) || Clem Labine (15) || 22,891 || 55–59
|- style="background:#fbb"
| 115 || August 21 || @ Cubs || 4–6 || Sam Jones (7–11) || Robin Roberts (14–14) || Turk Lown (12) || 6,750 || 55–60
|- style="background:#fbb"
| 116 || August 22 || @ Cubs || 3–8 || Bob Rush (12–6) || Harvey Haddix (11–5) || None || 5,782 || 55–61
|- style="background:#fbb"
| 117 || August 23 || @ Braves || 5–11 || Ray Crone (10–8) || Curt Simmons (10–8) || Ernie Johnson (6) || 25,493 || 55–62
|- style="background:#fbb"
| 118 || August 24 || @ Braves || 1–6 || Warren Spahn (15–9) || Robin Roberts (14–15) || None || 31,774 || 55–63
|- style="background:#bfb"
| 119 || August 25 || @ Braves || 3–0 || Bob Miller (2–5) || Lew Burdette (16–8) || None || 29,826 || 56–63
|- style="background:#fbb"
| 120 || August 26 (1) || @ Redlegs || 5–10 || Art Fowler (9–10) || Ron Negray (2–3) || None || see 2nd game || 56–64
|- style="background:#bfb"
| 121 || August 26 (2) || @ Redlegs || 11–4 || Harvey Haddix (12–5) || Brooks Lawrence (16–8) || None || 28,361 || 57–64
|- style="background:#bfb"
| 122 || August 28 || @ Cardinals || 6–4 || Curt Simmons (11–8) || Lindy McDaniel (4–5) || None || 11,987 || 58–64
|- style="background:#bfb"
| 123 || August 29 || @ Cardinals || 8–6 || Robin Roberts (15–15) || Bob Blaylock (1–5) || None || 7,828 || 59–64
|- style="background:#fbb"
| 124 || August 31 || @ Pirates || 3–6 || Ron Kline (12–15) || Granny Hamner (0–1) || Howie Pollet (2) || 11,147 || 59–65
|-

|- style="background:#bfb"
| 125 || September 1 || @ Pirates || 3–2 || Saul Rogovin (7–5) || Dick Hall (0–7) || None || 5,071 || 60–65
|- style="background:#fbb"
| 126 || September 2 (1) || @ Pirates || 6–10 || Vern Law (7–14) || Curt Simmons (11–9) || None || see 2nd game || 60–66
|- style="background:#fbb"
| 127 || September 2 (2) || @ Pirates || 1–5 || Cholly Naranjo (1–1) || Robin Roberts (15–16) || None || 12,470 || 60–67
|- style="background:#bfb"
| 128 || September 3 (1) || Giants || 5–1 || Bob Miller (3–5) || Joe Margoneri (5–5) || None || see 2nd game || 61–67
|- style="background:#fbb"
| 129 || September 3 (2) || Giants || 1–2 || Steve Ridzik (5–2) || Jack Meyer (7–7) || Hoyt Wilhelm (8) || 19,898 || 61–68
|- style="background:#fbb"
| 130 || September 4 || Giants || 2–7 || Max Surkont (2–1) || Harvey Haddix (12–6) || None || 6,049 || 61–69
|- style="background:#fbb"
| 131 || September 5 || Giants || 4–5 (10) || Dick Littlefield (3–5) || Jack Meyer (7–8) || None || 6,532 || 61–70
|- style="background:#bfb"
| 132 || September 7 || Pirates || 5–2 || Robin Roberts (16–16) || Bob Friend (15–15) || None || 7,835 || 62–70
|- style="background:#fbb"
| 133 || September 8 || Pirates || 4–5 || Roy Face (11–9) || Ben Flowers (1–2) || Dick Hall (1) || 4,806 || 62–71
|- style="background:#fbb"
| 134 || September 9 (1) || Pirates || 1–4 (10) || Ron Kline (13–16) || Bob Miller (3–6) || Roy Face (5) || see 2nd game || 62–72
|- style="background:#bfb"
| 135 || September 9 (2) || Pirates || 6–5 (10) || Robin Roberts (17–16) || Cholly Naranjo (1–2) || None || 11,104 || 63–72
|- style="background:#fbb"
| 136 || September 11 || Cardinals || 3–5 || Herm Wehmeier (11–9) || Curt Simmons (11–10) || Larry Jackson (9) || 7,609 || 63–73
|- style="background:#fbb"
| 137 || September 13 (1) || Braves || 2–3 (13) || Taylor Phillips (5–2) || Jack Meyer (7–9) || None || see 2nd game || 63–74
|- style="background:#fbb"
| 138 || September 13 (2) || Braves || 3–4 (12) || Warren Spahn (17–10) || Ben Flowers (1–3) || None || 23,826 || 63–75
|- style="background:#bfb"
| 139 || September 14 || Braves || 13–1 || Harvey Haddix (13–6) || Lew Burdette (18–10) || None || 17,016 || 64–75
|- style="background:#bfb"
| 140 || September 15 || Braves || 6–5 || Curt Simmons (12–10) || Bob Trowbridge (3–2) || Robin Roberts (3) || 9,231 || 65–75
|- style="background:#fbb"
| 141 || September 16 (1) || Cubs || 4–7 || Warren Hacker (3–12) || Saul Rogovin (7–6) || Turk Lown (13) || see 2nd game || 65–76
|- style="background:#bfb"
| 142 || September 16 (2) || Cubs || 4–1 || Jack Sanford (1–0) || Sam Jones (9–14) || Ron Negray (3) || 7,408 || 66–76
|- style="background:#bfb"
| 143 || September 18 (1) || Redlegs || 4–3 || Curt Simmons (13–10) || Larry Jansen (2–2) || None || see 2nd game || 67–76
|- style="background:#bfb"
| 144 || September 18 (2) || Redlegs || 7–4 || Robin Roberts (18–16) || Art Fowler (11–11) || None || 21,224 || 68–76
|- style="background:#fbb"
| 145 || September 19 (1) || Redlegs || 3–6 || Johnny Klippstein (12–11) || Jack Meyer (7–10) || Hersh Freeman (14) || see 2nd game || 68–77
|- style="background:#fbb"
| 146 || September 19 (2) || Redlegs || 0–6 || Tom Acker (3–3) || Harvey Haddix (13–7) || None || 13,614 || 68–78
|- style="background:#fbb"
| 147 || September 21 || @ Giants || 3–7 || Johnny Antonelli (18–13) || Turk Farrell (0–1) || None || 3,231 || 68–79
|- style="background:#fbb"
| 148 || September 22 || @ Giants || 1–2 || Al Worthington (6–14) || Robin Roberts (18–17) || None || 2,496 || 68–80
|- style="background:#bfb"
| 149 || September 23 || @ Giants || 6–2 || Curt Simmons (14–10) || Rubén Gómez (7–17) || None || 6,134 || 69–80
|- style="background:#fbb"
| 150 || September 25 || @ Dodgers || 0–5 || Sal Maglie (12–5) || Jack Meyer (7–11) || None || 15,204 || 69–81
|- style="background:#bfb"
| 151 || September 16 || @ Dodgers || 7–3 || Robin Roberts (19–17) || Don Newcombe (26–7) || None || 7,847 || 70–81
|- style="background:#bbb"
| – || September 28 || Giants || colspan=6 | Postponed (rain); Makeup: September 30 as a traditional double-header
|- style="background:#fbb"
| 152 || September 29 || Giants || 0–2 || Johnny Antonelli (20–13) || Harvey Haddix (13–8) || None || 4,867 || 70–82
|- style="background:#fbb"
| 153 || September 30 (1) || Giants || 3–8 || Al Worthington (7–14) || Robin Roberts (19–18) || Windy McCall (7) || see 2nd game || 70–83
|- style="background:#bfb"
| 154 || September 30 (2) || Giants || 5–2 || Curt Simmons (15–10) || Roy Wright (0–1) || None || 7,406 || 71–83
|-

| style="text-align:left;" |
The second game on May 13 was suspended (Sunday curfew) in the top of the eighth inning with the score 6–2 and was completed July 3, 1956.
The September 14, 1956, game was protested by the Braves in the bottom of the second inning. The protest was later denied.

Roster

Player stats

Batting

Starters by position 
Note: Pos = Position; G = Games played; AB = At bats; H = Hits; Avg. = Batting average; HR = Home runs; RBI = Runs batted in

Other batters 
Note: G = Games played; AB = At bats; H = Hits; Avg. = Batting average; HR = Home runs; RBI = Runs batted in

Pitching

Starting pitchers 
Note: G = Games pitched; IP = Innings pitched; W = Wins; L = Losses; ERA = Earned run average; SO = Strikeouts

Other pitchers 
Note: G = Games pitched; IP = Innings pitched; W = Wins; L = Losses; ERA = Earned run average; SO = Strikeouts

Relief pitchers 
Note: G = Games pitched; W = Wins; L = Losses; SV = Saves; ERA = Earned run average; SO = Strikeouts

Farm system 

LEAGUE CHAMPIONS: Schenectady

Notes

References 
1956 Philadelphia Phillies season at Baseball Reference

Philadelphia Phillies seasons
Philadelphia Phillies season
Philadelphia